is the third main entry in the Summon Night series of video games. The game was initially developed by Flight-Plan and released by Banpresto for the PlayStation 2 in 2003. The game was later remade for the PlayStation Portable in 2012. Both versions were only released in Japan, not being localized into English for any other regions.

Gameplay
The game plays as a tactical role-playing game. The game contains multiple difficulty levels.

Story
The game follows the male protagonist Rexx and the female protagonist Aty. As with other game's in the series, it takes place in the fictional world of Lyndbaum.

Development
The initial version of the game was developed by Flight-Plan and published by Banpresto. The game was released on August 7, 2003, on the PlayStation 2 video game console. The game was only released in Japan, it was not localized into English for any other regions.

The PSP version of the game was created upon Namco Bandai acquiring Banpresto, who had the rights to the Summon Night IP. The game, along with its sequel, Summon Night 4, were remade in order to promote the release of a new game on the platform, 2013's Summon Night 5. With Flight-Plan's closure, all three titles were developed by Felistella. The game was released on October 4, 2012.

Reception and sales
The PlayStation 2 release of the game sold over 156,000 copies it first week of sales, higher than both of the later mainline series releases.

Legacy
Main characters Rexx and Aty both make appearances in future sequel Summon Night 5. Aty appears as a playable character in the crossover video game Project X Zone 2.

References 

2003 video games
Felistella games
Japan-exclusive video games
PlayStation 2 games
PlayStation Portable games
Role-playing video games
Single-player video games
Summon Night
Video games developed in Japan
Video games featuring protagonists of selectable gender
Flight-Plan games